Sabina Park is a 20,000 capacity cricket ground in Kingston, Jamaica. It is one of the grounds used as by the West Indies cricket team and is owned by Kingston Cricket Club and the Jamaica Cricket Association. The ground was first used in the 1880s and hosted its first Test match in 1930 when the West Indies played England in a timeless Test. A single women's Test match was held at the ground in 1976. One Day Internationals (ODIs) have been played at the ground since 1984 and Twenty20 Internationals (T20Is) since 2014.

In cricket, a five-wicket haul (also known as a "five-for" or "fifer") refers to a bowler taking five or more wickets in a single innings. This is regarded as a notable achievement. This article details the five-wicket hauls taken on the ground in official international matches.

The first five-wicket haul to be taken on the ground in an international match was taken by West Indian Tommy Scott in the grounds first Test match in 1930. Scott took five wickets for 266 runs (5/266), bowling 80 overs in the game's first innings. Australian Marie Cornish took a five-wicket haul in the only women's Test match on the ground in 1976 and is the only woman to take an international five-wicket haul on the ground.  no five-wicket hauls have been taken in an ODI or T20I match on the ground.

Key

Test Match five-wicket hauls

A total of 70 five-wicket hauls have been taken in Test matches on the ground, 69 in men's Tests and one in the only women's Test match played at Sabina Park.

Men's matches

Women's matches

Notes

References

External links
International five-wicket hauls at Sabina Park, CricInfo

Sabina Park
Sabina Park